Public toilets (or public WC) in Bratislava, Slovakia are managed by the local government, which pays for the water. Bratislava is known for having a very limited number of public restrooms and their appearance has changed little since the fall of the Soviet Union. Unlike restrooms in spaces such as shopping malls, gas stations and restaurants traditional public toilets are staffed with a washroom attendant. As a rule of thumb, public toilets in Bratislava require payment for use.

, urinating or defecating in public in Slovakia is punishable by a fine of €33. The mistrust of public toilets, including at night when they are lit, is such that many prefer the toilets in fast food restaurants. Many restaurants and pubs lock their toilets and issue keys only upon demand by their customers. In spite of queues, there were no plans to build additional public restrooms in Bratislava . This has been to the detriment of the city's tourism industry with reports from Bratislava city guides and travel agencies citing the lack of public toilets in the city as one of the hurdles in tourism development.

History
During the Soviet era, the tradition of public toilets formed, which was maintained into the 21st century. Public toilets were separated by sex, entrances being guarded by notoriously ill-tempered restroom ladies. The client would disclose whether they needed to urinate or defecate, and would be charged accordingly, with the latter costing more. Finally, the client was issued their share of toilet paper, sometimes with an embarrassing negotiation regarding the need for more.

The following public toilets have been closed in Bratislava: Suché mýto, Hurbanovo Námestie and metal toilets on Vajanského Nábrežie. In 2011, the Borough of Old Town decided to close half of its public toilets, claiming to use the money saved in this way for maintaining green areas and cleaning. Referring to a survey done during the week of 22 February to 27 February 2011, Tomáš Halán, spokesperson for the Borough of Old Town, stated that there was a case in the survey in which "one visitor cost 22 euro".

Partial list of public toilets in Bratislava
The following is a partial list of public toilets in Bratislava.

Public toilets in mass transport systems in Bratislava
 Bratislava-Petržalka railway station
 Bratislava main railway station
 Železnicná stanica Vinohrady
 Železnicná stanica Nove Mesto
 Main bus station Mlynske Nivy
 M. R. Štefánik Airport

References

Further reading
  PDF from Old Town Courier Volume II. No. 7 (2008).]

Buildings and structures in Bratislava